An election to Limerick City Council took place on 27 June 1991 as part of that year's Irish local elections. 17 councillors were elected from four electoral divisions by PR-STV voting for an eight-year term of office.

Results by party

Results by Electoral Area

Limerick No.1

Limerick No.2

Limerick No.3

Limerick No.4

External links

1991 Irish local elections
1991